"Please Don't Talk to the Lifeguard" is a song by American pop singer Diane Ray. It was featured on her 1964 album The Exciting Years, and reached number 31 on the Billboard Hot 100.

Original version 
Originally released as a single by Andrea Carroll on Epic Records in 1961, Andrea's version ceased to perform as successfully as Diane's rendition eventually would.

Chart performance
The song debuted on the Hot 100 chart dated August 3, 1963. It peaked seven weeks later at number 31. "Please Don't Talk to the Lifeguard" spent a total of 9 weeks on the chart. Ray's next single, "My Summer Love", failed to impact any chart, as did her subsequent singles, making her a one-hit wonder.

Inclusion on compilations
The song has been included on numerous girl-pop compilations, including Growin' Up Too Fast: The Girl Group Anthology (1996), I Wish I Were a Princess: The Great Lost Female Teen Idols (1997), and Early Girls, Vol. 3 (2000).

References

External links
 Hear this song on YouTube
 "Please Don't Talk to the Lifeguard" at Discogs

American pop songs
1963 songs